Futball Klub Csíkszereda Miercurea Ciuc, commonly known as Csíkszereda Miercurea Ciuc or simply Csíkszereda, is a Romanian professional football club based in Miercurea Ciuc, Harghita County, which competes in the Liga II.

The current name of the team is an amalgamation of both the Hungarian and Romanian names of the city, respectively, with Miercurea Ciuc having a majority of Szekler population. Csíkszereda was originally established in 1904 in Austria-Hungary, and was an amateur team without notable results at national level. Refounded in 1919, it participated in the Romanian leagues until 1940, and eventually reached the second tier of Hungary after Northern Transylvania was assigned to the latter country. After World War II, the region was returned to Romania and Csíkszereda took a downward slope until 1971, when it participated in the Romanian third division for the first time.

After the fall of communism in 1989, the team encountered financial issues and moved constantly between the third and fourth tiers. Csíkszereda even withdrew from the championship in 2000, but after a decade of amateurism and subsistence was again refounded and managed to promote to the second league at the end of the 2018–19 season.

History

First years between Hungary and Romania (1904–1971)
Although the history of football from Miercurea Ciuc started back in 1904, when Transylvania was still part of Austria-Hungary, the football club of the city was an amateur one, without significant results at the national level. The club was re-founded in 1919 at a superior level of professionalism, under the name of Asociația de Educație Fizică din Miercurea Ciuc and became part of the Kingdom of Romania, but the following years turned out to be as unfruitful as before for "the Székelys", who couldn't achieve notable results not even in the Romanian leagues.

In August 1940 Kingdom of Hungary annexed Northern Transylvania, including Miercurea Ciuc, as a result of the Second Vienna Award and the team started to appear on the map of the Hungarian leagues under the Hungarian name of Csíkszeredai Testnevelési Egylet (Association of Physical Education in Csíkszereda). During the 1943–44 season Ciucanii were part of the third tier, Nemzeti Bajnokság III, Székely Land series, where they finished last, 5th out of only five teams. Next season, 1944–45, Csíkszeredai TE was part of the second league, Nemzeti Bajnokság II, due to the expansion of the league system, but the championship was interrupted due to the movement of the front in the World War II, and Csíkszeredai TE never played in the Hungarian leagues again: the annexed region was occupied by Romanian troops in 1944 and awarded to Kingdom of Romania at the end of the war.

Back in the Romanian leagues under the newly established Communist regime, the life of the Székelys was not an easy one, even in the beginning (until 1960) the Stalinist regime in his attempt to administer the country through raions, founded a raion named Magyar Autonomous Region. The oppressive regime began the forced nationalization and the people of Hungarian ethnicity, as well as the Székelys, were frequently forced to change their name, in a one with Romanian roots. The cases of footballers of Hungarian ethnicity forced to change their name were often, among them: József Pecsovszky who became Iosif Petschovschi, Lajos Sătmăreanu (Ludovic Sătmăreanu), Sándor Kulcsár (Alexandru Culcear), Emerich Jenei (Emeric Ienei). Lack of support from the regime combined also with the little interest of the local people for football, in a city where Ice hockey and HSC Csíkszereda (multiple champions of Romania) were the main attraction, have resulted in poor to very weak results for the football team, which played in the amateur leagues, Divizia D, until 1971.

Ascent to Divizia C (1971–1990)

1971–72 season was the first one played by the club in the Divizia C, but AS Miercurea Ciuc, as it was named then, relegated, after finishing 13th out of 14. Only one season spent the club from Miercurea Ciuc in the fourth tier, before promoting back, at the end of the 1972–73 edition. Followed three consecutive seasons in which the club achieved its best performances until then, 1973–74 – 5th, 1974–75 – 8th and 1975–76 – 15th. The rank obtained at the end of the last season brought another relegation for the club, but Ciucanii had now the taste of higher levels football and after another season spent in the Divizia D, promoted back.

The third spell of "the Red and Blacks" on the third stage of the Romanian football was a longer one, originally under the name of IUPS Miercurea Ciuc, name of the main sponsor, IUPS (Întreprinderea de Utilaje și Piese de Schimb) translated as Machinery and Spare Parts Undertaking, a factory under the direct rule of the communist regime (as all the factories from that period), at the same time signaling the fact that the regime finally turned its "face" to the football from the region, the club was ranked 9th at the end of the 1977–78 season. In 1978 IUPS became a subsidiary of Uzina Tractorul Brașov (Romanian main tractors factory) and changed its name in Tractor Undertaking, the football team followed its main sponsor and changed its name in Tractorul Miercurea Ciuc. For the next five seasons in which the club from Miercurea Ciuc played in the third tier, the following rankings were obtained: 1978–79 – 7th, 1979–80 – 14th, 1980–81 – 6th, 1981–82 – 7th and 1982–83 – 16th.

"The Székelys" promoted back in 1988, after five years of absence, this time under the name of Rapid Miercurea Ciuc. 1988–89 season was a historical one for Rapid, which was ranked 3rd, right behind IMASA Sfântu Gheorghe and Progresul Odorheiu Secuiesc, surpassing its old record, 5th place at the end of the 1973–74 edition, then avoiding a last-minute relegation at the end of the 1989–90 season (14th out of 16th). Romanian Revolution of 1989 was not necessarily a rescue for the club, which was in its last decade sponsored by the regime through its factory.

Ups and downs, dissolution and rebirth (1990–2014)
The 1990s was a tumultuous period for Rapid, as for many Romanian clubs, pivoting quite enough between the 3rd, respectively 4th level of the Romanian football. The club from Miercurea Ciuc divided the decade, five years being spent in the Divizia C and five years in the Divizia D, with the following results: 1990–91 – 7th, 1991–92 – 5th (withdrew at the end of the season), 1992–93 – 1st (promoted back to Divizia C), 1993–94 – 17th (relegated), 1994–95 – 2nd in Divizia D, 1995–96 – 1st in Divizia D, 1996–97 – 1st (promoted), 1997–98 – 15th (relegated), 1998–99 – 1st (promoted), 1999–2000 – 15th (relegated).

After a decade full of ups and downs, the club started the 2000s as a newly relegated team, but surprisingly the club was included by the Romanian Football Federation for 2000–01 season of Divizia C. In the summer of 2000 due to lack of founds, Rapid withdrew, before the start of the season. This was basically the end of an era for the football from the county seat of Harghita County. Due to lack of funds and with the fans being more oriented to the ice hockey team, most popular of the county's clubs, Rapid continued the activity at the limit of subsistence, until finally succumbed. In 2010 the football club was re-founded, this time under the name of CSM Miercurea Ciuc, also known in Hungarian as VSK Csíkszereda, and after a 2nd place at the end of the 2010–11 edition, Ciucanii won the Harghita County championship at the end of the 2011–12 season, but lost the Liga III promotion play-off, with the score of 1–5, against CSM Făgăraș, Brașov County champions.

In the summer of 2012 CSM Miercurea Ciuc was renamed as FK Miercurea Ciuc, also known in Hungarian as FK Csíkszereda. Led by former player of Rapid București and FC Brașov, Róbert Ilyés, who was named in 2013 as player-manager of the squad, the Székelys won again the Liga IV, Harghita Series, but lost dramatically the promotion play-off, this time 2–3 against Mureșul Luduș, Mureș County champions. After winning the third consecutive season of Liga IV, Harghita Series, Ciucanii finally promoted at the end of the 2013–14 season, after a 2–0 win against ASF Zărnești, champions of Brașov County. Also in 2013, the club has entered into a partnership with NB I member Puskás Akadémia and they created The Football Academy of Székely Land.

Golden Age (2014–present)
Unlike its region colleague, Sepsi OSK Sfântu Gheorghe, which has been promoted consecutively to the first league, FK Csíkszereda encountered some difficulties. The first season spent in the third tier, after an absence of 14 years, was finished on the 6th place, then followed by a 5th place at the end of the 2015–16 edition. 2016–17 season brought an important performance, "the Red and Blacks" being ranked 3rd, thus equaling their best performance, obtained in 1989, 28 years before. But this performance was in fact, a real drama because FK Miercurea Ciuc led the series until the final round, when they lost 0–1 at home, against Știința Miroslava, Miroslava promoting also after CSM Pașcani goalkeeper scored a goal in the last minute of the match against AFC Hărman, another aspirant for promotion. After missing the promotion for a distance of 1 point, Miercurea Ciuc started full of hope the 2017–18 season, but this time missed the promotion for 2 points, however being ranked 2nd, the best performance of the club ever.

In the summer of 2018 Romanian Football Federation moved the team from the first series (Moldavia region) to the fifth series (Transylvania region) region. Even if some rivals saw it as an advantage, Miercurea Ciuc/Csíkszereda had a tough battle, but not against Minaur Baia Mare or 1. FC Gloria (the unofficial successor of Gloria Bistrița), which were seen as main rivals, but against Comuna Recea, a total surprise of the season. Finally "the Red and Black" promoted to Liga II, for the first time in the history of 115 years old of football from Miercurea Ciuc. In this season the club was led from the bench by Valentin Suciu, the man who also promoted Sepsi OSK Sfântu Gheorghe from Liga IV to Liga I. Suciu also led the team to the best result in the Romanian Cup, where it was eliminated only in the quarter-finals by the top-flight side CS Universitatea Craiova, but not before eliminating Dinamo București in the round of 16.

The great run from the Romanian Cup, bring in the press the information that along with several other sponsors, FK Miercurea Ciuc (FK Csíkszereda) receives financing from the Government of Hungary, which has sparked controversy in Romania. However, the sum of €3.2 million—which can double if performance clauses are met—is supposed to be invested exclusively in club infrastructure development and the youth sector.

Ground

The club plays its home matches on Municipal Stadium in Miercurea Ciuc, which has a capacity of 1,200 seats. Opened in the first part of the 20th century, the stadium underwent important expansion and renovation works between 2016 and 2017, which were sponsored by the Government of Hungary.

Support
FK Miercurea Ciuc has many supporters in Miercurea Ciuc and especially in Harghita County. Even if the club does not have an ultras group, "the Red and Blacks" are well supported by the local community, which creates an enthusiastic atmosphere at the home matches. FK Csíkszereda supporters consider Sepsi OSK Sfântu Gheorghe supporters (Székely Légió) to be their allies, fans of both teams had the opportunity to support the other during important matches. During the matches, they are used to display flags of the Székely Land and Hungary.

Rivalries
FK Miercurea Ciuc does not have many important rivalries, however, a local one, of little intensity, exist against AFC Odorheiu Secuiesc.

Honours

Leagues
Liga III
Winners (1): 2018–19
Runners-up (1): 2017–18
Liga IV – Harghita County
Winners (14): 1969–70, 1970–71, 1972–73, 1976–77, 1984–85, 1985–86, 1987–88, 1992–93, 1995–96, 1996–97, 1998–99, 2011–12, 2012–13, 2013–14
Runners-up (3): 1968–69, 1994–95, 2010–11

Cups
Cupa României – Harghita County
Winners (3): 2011–12, 2012–13, 2013–14
Runners-up (1): 2010–11

Players

First-team squad

Out on loan

Club officials

Board of directors

Current technical staff

League history

References

External links
 

 
Football clubs in Romania
Football clubs in Harghita County
Sport in Miercurea Ciuc
Association football clubs established in 1904
Liga II clubs
Liga III clubs
Liga IV clubs
FK Csíkszereda Miercurea Ciuc